Myrcia tetraphylla is a species of plant in the family Myrtaceae. It is endemic to coastal rainforest habitats in southern Bahia, Brazil. The tree was first described in 2010, grows to between 2 and 8 metres tall, and produces purple fruits between 15 and 22mm in diameter.

References

tetraphylla
Crops originating from the Americas
Crops originating from Brazil
Tropical fruit
Fruits originating in South America
Endemic flora of Brazil
Fruit trees
Berries
Plants described in 2010